Przegląd (English: Review) is a weekly Polish news and opinion magazine published in Warsaw, Poland.

History and profile
Przegląd was started in 1990 as the successor of another weekly, Przegląd Tygodniowy, which had been published since 1982. The Editor-in-chief is Jerzy Domański.

Editorial board: Krystyna Kofta, Krzysztof Teodor Toeplitz, Piotr Gadzinowski, Bronisław Łagowski

Aleksander Małachowski and Stanisław Lem published in Przegląd.

Editorial stance 

Przegląd is a left-wing publication, and is considered to be connected with two Polish left-wing political parties, the Democratic Left Alliance and Labour Union. It has been critical of the policies of all post-communist governments, and is opposed to the monetarist policies that were instituted by Polish economist and finance minister Leszek Balcerowicz. The magazine was a vocal opponent of Poland's military presence in Iraq, and remains a persistent critic of the role that the Catholic Church plays in the social and political life of Poland.

See also
 List of magazines in Poland

References

External links
 Przegląd website

1990 establishments in Poland
Magazines established in 1990
Magazines published in Warsaw
News magazines published in Poland
Polish-language magazines
Weekly magazines published in Poland